Thomas Blake may refer to:

 Thomas Blake (minister) (c. 1597–1657), English clergyman and controversialist
 Thomas Blake (tennis) (born 1976), American professional tennis player
 Thomas Blake (MP) (1825–1901), British politician
 Thomas Blake (cricketer) (1805–1895), English cricketer
 Catman's alter-ego, Thomas Blake
 Tom Blake (surfer)  (1902–1994), American surfer and inventor
 Thomas H. Blake (1792–1849), U.S. Representative from Indiana
 Sir Thomas Blake, 2nd Baronet (died 1642)
 Thomas Blake Glover (1838–1911), Scottish merchant associated with Japan
 Thomas Blake, mayor of Galway, 1495–1496

See also
 Blake baronets
 Blake (surname)